The Leica X-U (Typ 113) is a compact underwater camera by Leica Camera, released on 20 January 2016. The Leica X-U combines the APS-C format CMOS sensor of 16.2 megapixels with the Leica Summilux 23 mm (equals 35 mm field of view in 35 mm-format) f/1.7 ASPH lens. The camera records video in 1920 x 1080 or 1280 x 720 pixel resolution at 30 frames per second in MP4 video format. Made in Germany in collaboration with Audi Design, the Leica X-U has a aluminium top plate and an anti-slip TPE protective armor. The camera is fully waterproof at depths of up to 15 m or 49 feet.

Gallery

References

External links
 

Leica digital cameras
Cameras introduced in 2016
Point-and-shoot cameras
Underwater cameras